Agnes Leslie Gordon (née Willson,  April 25, 1906 – May 24, 1967) was a Canadian bridge player. 

She was born in Ridgetown, Ontario and graduated from the University of Ontario. She moved to Buffalo, New York after her marriage in 1930, although she remained a Canadian citizen.

At the North American Bridge Championships meet in November–December 1963 (then called "Fall Nationals"), Gordon and Eric Murray won the premier annual  championship of the North America, the Rockwell Mixed Pairs. Their score in the final session, 506.5  of 650 top, or 78%, is the highest single-session score in the history of national-level ACBL pairs competition (at least, it was from the 1930s to 2009). During the same 16-day meet, Gordon and Helen Portugal tied for first place among eight pairs in trials to play on the USA women team in May 1964. They went on to earn silver medals in the second quadrennial World Team Olympiad with a second-place finish behind Great Britain.

She died in a Buffalo hospital in 1967 from cancer.

Gordon was inducted into the ACBL Hall of Fame in 2009.

Bridge accomplishments

Honors

 ACBL Hall of Fame, Von Zedtwitz Award 2009

Wins

 North American Bridge Championships (6)
 Rockwell Mixed Pairs (1) 1963 
 Whitehead Women's Pairs (1) 1961 
 Wagar Women's Knockout Teams (1) 1967 
 Chicago Mixed Board-a-Match (2) 1956, 1962 
 Reisinger (1) 1948

Runners-up

 North American Bridge Championships
 Rockwell Mixed Pairs (1) 1956 
 Whitehead Women's Pairs (1) 1959 
 Smith Life Master Women's Pairs (1) 1964 
 Wagar Women's Knockout Teams (3) 1957, 1963, 1964 
 Chicago Mixed Board-a-Match (2) 1951, 1955

Notes

References

External links
 
 

1906 births
1967 deaths
Canadian contract bridge players
Canadian expatriates in the United States
Sportspeople from Buffalo, New York
Sportspeople from Chatham-Kent
Deaths from cancer in New York (state)